Longxing is a town in Daozhen Gelao and Miao Autonomous County, Guizhou, China.

Administrative division
As of 2016, the town is divided into nine villages: 
 Aiguo 
 Lianxing 
 Qianjin 
 Sanlong 
 Dalian 
 Lianchi 
 Wanxi 
 Yonghong 
 Shamu

Economy
The town's main industries are agriculture, breading industry, and mining service. Tobacco is the main source of local income.

Tourist attractions
Mopan Mountain is a famous scenic spot in the town. 

The main attraction is the Huangni Cave.

References

Bibliography

Towns of Zunyi